"Down on the Farm" is a song written by Jerry Laseter and Kerry Kurt Phillips and recorded by American country music artist Tim McGraw. It was released in July 1994 as the third single from McGraw's 1994 album Not a Moment Too Soon. The song peaked at number 2 on the US Billboard Hot Country Singles & Tracks chart, behind Joe Diffie's "Third Rock from the Sun".

Critical reception
Billboard Magazine called the song a "backwoods party song."

Music video
The music video takes place in Tim McGraw's home state of Louisiana. It features him singing to a crowd. It was directed by his usual director of choice Sherman Halsey, who directed almost all of his music videos.

Chart positions
"Down on the Farm" debuted at number 67 on the U.S. Billboard Hot Country Singles & Tracks for the week of July 16, 1994.

Year-end charts

References

1994 singles
1994 songs
Tim McGraw songs
Song recordings produced by Byron Gallimore
Song recordings produced by James Stroud
Music videos directed by Sherman Halsey
Curb Records singles
Songs written by Kerry Kurt Phillips